Eugene Richards Jr. (born September 29, 1953) is an American former Major League Baseball (MLB) outfielder. He played eight seasons in the Majors, from 1977 until 1984, for the San Diego Padres and San Francisco Giants. As a rookie with San Diego in 1977, he set a modern-day MLB rookie single-season record for stolen bases.

Playing career
He was the first player selected (by the Padres) in the 1975 January Major League Baseball Draft. Richards played two seasons (1975–1976) of minor league baseball. In his first pro season, spent with the Class A Reno Silver Sox, he led the 1975 California League in hits (191 in 134 games played), runs (148), stolen bases (85) and batting average (.381). Reno won the California League championship and Richards was named the circuit's Most Valuable Player. Promoted all the way to the Triple-A Hawaii Islanders in 1976, he led the Pacific Coast League in hits (173) and batted .331.

In 1977, he made his major league debut with San Diego and set a then modern-day MLB rookie record with 56 stolen bases during the season, surpassing the previous mark of 49 set by Rollie Zeider in 1910 and tied by Sonny Jackson in 1966. He finished the season batting .290, and finished third in the voting for the National League Rookie of the Year Award. In 1980, Richards was tied for 22nd place in MVP voting after he led the league in singles with 151, and set a then-Padres single-season record with 194 hits, broken by Tony Gwynn in 1984.

Richards held then-Padres career records for triples (63) and steals (242), also broken by Gwynn.

See also
 List of Major League Baseball annual triples leaders
 List of Major League Baseball single-game hits leaders

Notes

References

External links

1953 births
20th-century African-American sportspeople
21st-century African-American people
African-American baseball players
Hawaii Islanders players
Living people
Major League Baseball outfielders
Minor league baseball managers
Reno Silver Sox players
San Diego Padres players
San Francisco Giants players
Seattle Mariners scouts
South Carolina State Bulldogs baseball players
Winter Haven Super Sox players